Giovanni de' Vecchi (died 1509) was a Roman Catholic prelate who served as Bishop of Termoli (1497–1509).

Biography
On 9 January 1497, Giovanni de' Vecchi was appointed during the papacy of Pope Alexander VI as Bishop of Termoli.
He served as Bishop of Termoli until his death in 1509.

References

External links and additional sources
 (Chronology of Bishops) 
 (Chronology of Bishops) 

15th-century Italian Roman Catholic bishops
16th-century Italian Roman Catholic bishops
Bishops appointed by Pope Alexander VI
1509 deaths